"Why Dontcha Call Me No More" is a song by American singer Yahzarah. The song was released in March 2010 as the lead single for her third studio album, The Ballad of Purple St. James.

Writing and recording
The song was written by YahZarah and Phonte Coleman and was produced by Nicolay and Phonte. The song features several instruments including the keyboard, tambourine, live handclaps, drums, the acoustic, bass, and electric guitars.

Release and promotion
In March 2010, "Why Dontcha Call Me No More" was released as the first single of the album and available as a free download on the Foreign Exchange Music's website. The song was available as a free download from The Foreign Exchange Music's website. The song received over 1,000 downloads within the following week.

Music video

The music video was released to YouTube on May 19, 2010. The video was directed by Matt Koza. The music video was shot back-to-back with Yahzarah's theme song "Yahz", which precedes to "Why Dontcha Call Me No More".

The theme of the video was based around 80's cartoon Jem (TV series). Most of video effects were green screen with Yahzarah wearing a pink dress. The other scenes involved Yahzarah performing with band and her discovering that her boyfriend was cheating on her with another girl. The latter ends with her confronting him with her friends and leaving with her new boyfriend (Jesse Boykins III). The video also features cameos appearances from Nicolay and Phonte of The Foreign Exchange, Aimee Flint, and Zarinah.

The choreographer was Seku Grey and make-up artist was Jessica Williams. Hair and styling was provided by Yarde Noir and Jermal Harris. The 2nd unit cameras were operated by Bunker Seyfert. In addition to the release of the music video, behind-the-scene clips and photos are available on The Foreign Exchange Music's website.

Critical response
The song received positive feedback from fans and reviewers of the song. Andy Kellman of Allmusic.com stated,

Personnel
Vocals: Yahzarah
Written by: Yahzarah and Phonte Coleman
Keyboard: Nicolay
Acoustic Guitar: Nicolay
Bass Guitar: Zo!
Electric guitar: Chris Boerner
Drums: Lil' John Roberts
Handclaps and Tambourine: Yahzarah and Phonte
Produced by: Nicolay and Phonte

See also 
 Yahzarah discography

References

2010 songs
Electropop songs